The Cedarvale Botanic Garden and Restaurant was a botanical garden, cabins, and restaurant located  off I-35 at Exit 51 (Turner Falls), near the Arbuckle Mountains and one mile from Turner Falls Park in Davis, Oklahoma.

The gardens contained 2,500 tulips in the spring, with thousands of annual and perennial flowers from April to November. The site also included a tropical garden, swinging bridge, waterfalls, arboretum, and unusual geological formations, as well as a restaurant specializing in trout.

See also
 List of botanical gardens and arboretums in the United States

Botanical gardens in Oklahoma
Restaurants in Oklahoma
Protected areas of Murray County, Oklahoma